Khalil El-Yamani (born 24 October 1943) is a Moroccan basketball player. He competed in the men's tournament at the 1968 Summer Olympics.

References

1943 births
Living people
Moroccan men's basketball players
Olympic basketball players of Morocco
Basketball players at the 1968 Summer Olympics
Sportspeople from Rabat